Michael Fall, (born, Lokeren, June 9, 1980) is a Belgian DJ, producer, and remixer from Moerbeke-Waas, Belgium. Michael Fall is currently signed on different record labels worldwide. In the past he signed deals with major labels such as Universal Music Group, CNR Records in Belgium & ZYX Music records in Germany. He released many songs that have charted in Belgian and foreign charts. He ended his publishing contract with BMC Universal in November 2012 and signed a new publishing contract in November 2012 at the Dutch independent music publisher Strengholt Music Group until 2018. In 2013 he released his debut album called 'Turn on your radio' and was listed in the official Belgium album charts. Michael is the owner of MFrecords based in Belgium and he owns a record store in Zelzate. In 2014 he received a golden award for his debut album. On 31 July 2015, he released his second album called 'Ain't nothing but a party'. On August 28, 2020 Michael's single 'Winter' reached 1 million Spotify Streams. In April 2021 he released a new album on Zyx Music called 'Million Years'

Biography

Since Michael Fall released his first successful debut single "The Beach" in 2009, which was in the Belgium dance charts for a couple of weeks, one after another track was released. Currently, there are over 30 tracks released under his own name and 5 tracks as a producer of his dj/singer duo project 'Blend-it'. Michael Fall also had made some remixes for international artists and he produced several other artists.

The Belgian DJ, remixer and producer Michael Fall has already played in numerous clubs from his home base in Belgium which include clubs Riva (ex-The Temple / Boccaccio), Kokorico, Feestpaleis, Club One, La Luna Dancing, Dancing cocktail, Royal Club, Dancing Pallas, Pravda Room (Ex Sottos). Michael played regularly at various festivals including Beats of Summer in Blankenberge, Summer Carnival Kortrijk, House Clubbing festival, and abroad (World Sound Festival) in Barcelona, Peanuts bar in Egypt, Holland, England, and many others.

Michael's songs were included over 100 worldwide CD compilations and 100 numerous digital compilations. His tracks have been included on cd's and labels in Belgium, Spain, Poland, Germany, Holland, and even South Africa, Japan, and many others.

The biggest record labels he has worked with are ‘Magic Universal Poland’ (PL), Universal Music Group Belgium, ‘EMI Poland’ (PL). Some very successful records were licensed on the famous Dutch label Armada Music and German Kontor Records he also had record licenses in Japan, Germany, USA, South Africa to name a few.

Michael Fall has released singles featuring American rappers Fatman Scoop and Lumidee.

Michael Fall entered the digital charts several times gaining No. 1 and Top 10 positions in Beatport, iTunes, Traxsource, and in various European charts. Michael also reached the Belgian Ultratop 100 a couple of times.

La Bonita feat. Fatman Scoop in 2012 was 11 weeks in the German DDJC chart. In 2012 and 2013 other records were successful in German, Swiss & British dance charts. For example, ‘Body on fire’ reached a number 2 spot in BDC (British dance chart) and featured for weeks in the Swiss dance chart (sdc). The same goes for ‘She’s all I need ‘, Don't get lazy and ‘good times’, which were all included in the Swiss dance chart. (Wdjc.de/sdc)

In 2013 he released his first album 'Turn on your radio'. Some album tracks such as ‘Turn on your radio’ reached the Belgium Dance Charts.

In 2015 he released his second album 'Ain't Nothing but a party'. 
Three of the album tracks achieved an 8 weeks position in Belgium's dance chart with 'Find a way'. 'Go Deeper' for 4 weeks and 'Let Met Go' 6 weeks in this chart.

In April 2015 he reached high summits in Beatport's top 100 list with the deep house track. 'Go deeper', earning a No. 11 in the Nu-disco / deep list & released on May 15, 2015, on iTunes.

In 2016 'Let me go' reached 32 in Belgium's Ultratop Dance 50 chart.

In 2020 he signed with the German Zyx records label for a lucrative deal to release 2 albums.

Discography Hit Quotation Singles Belgium

Discography Hit Quotation Singles International

Discography Hit Quotation Album

Discography (Single Release)

Official Remixes in charts

Productions Collaborations

Official Remixes

CD Compilations 
2009 TopRequest Summermix (Mostiko CNR Records) "The Beach" 
2009 TopRadio The Partystation (Mostiko CNR Records) "The Beach" 
2010 ClubVibes 2010-01 (Mostiko CNR Records) "Drop The Beats" 
2010 Popcorn Hits Zima 2010 (EMI Music) "The Beach" 
2011 Mindblowing (MME Dance Division) "Love" (by Blend-It)
2012 VT4 Summervibes 2012 (News Records) "La Bonita"
2012 Ibiza 2012 - The Finest House Collection  (Kontor Records) "In The Rhythm"
2012 Tche Tcherere Tche Tche (Universal Music) "La Bonita"
2012 Ibiza Top 100 (Cloud 9 /Armada Music) "Turn On Your Radio"
2013 Disco House 2013 (Zyx) "Vixen"
2014 Club Sounds Vol. 68 (Sony Music) "Ring My Bell" Feat. Lumidee
2014 Club Summer 2014 (PolyStar/ Universal Music)"Buy Or Die"
2014 Urban Dance Vol. 16 (Warner Music) "Ring My Bell" Feat. Lumidee
2015 EDM 2015 (Zyx) "Treshold" (Festival Mix) 
2015 Serious Beats 82 (News Records) "Go Deeper"
2015 EDM Anthems (Zyx) "Stronger Together" (Michael Fall Radio Remix) 
2016 Summertime (Blanco y Negro Music) "Winter"
2016 Deep & House Ibiza (Vendetta Records) "Winter"
2016 I Like Fiesta 2016 (Blanco y Negro Music) "Winter"
2016 Deep & Future House (ZYX Music) "Let Me Go/Dream of you"
2016 Blanco y Negro Dj Culture Vol.6 (Blanco y Negro Music) "Winter"
2017 Apres Ski Dance Hits (ZYX Music) "(treshold) When You Touch Me There"
2017 Disco House (ZYX Music) "Let Me Go" "She's all I need"
2017 Club Trax: This Is Deep Vol. 1 (ZYX Music) "More To Love (Michael Fall Remix)" "Drifting Away"
2017 #Musicote Vol. 2 (Blanco y Negro Music) "Today"
2017 Blanco y Negro Dj Culture Vol.17 (Blanco y Negro Music) "Today"
2017 Playa Hits 2017 (Squad Music) "Drifting Away"
2017 Blanco y Negro Dj Culture Vol.20 (Blanco y Negro Music) "Throwin' It Out"
2017 Deep & House Ibiza 2 (Vendetta Records) "Throwin' It Out"
2017 Ahora 017 (Blanco y Negro Music) "Throwin' It Out"
2018 The best of Disco House (Zyx) "Stronger Together(Michael Fall Remix)"
2018 This is EDM (Zyx) "Ain't Nothing But A Party"
2018 EDM Classics (Zyx) "Treshold"
2018 Party Pop Hits (Zyx) "Ain't Nothing but a party" (Feat.Chappel)
2018 Décimo Anniversario (Squad Music) "Drifting Away" "You take my breath away" & "Find a way"
2019 Deephouse 2019 (Zyx) "Million Years"
2019 Festival Season Vol.1 (Zyx) "Million Years"
2019 Just Happy (Zyx) "Million Years"
2019 Ibiza World Club Tour Vol. 4 (Zyx) "Million Years"
2019 Festival Traxx (Zyx) "Million Years"
2020 Ibiza Summer Groove (Zyx) "Million Years"

2013 Album == Turn on your radio

2015 Album == Ain't nothing but a party

2021 Album == Million Years

External links
 http://www.ultratop.be
 http://www.ultratop.be/nl/showperson.asp?name=Michael+Brandt+%5BBE%5D
 http://www.musicmeter.nl/album/370975
 https://www.discogs.com/artist/1480142-Michael-Fall

1980 births
Living people
People from Lokeren
People from East Flanders
Belgian DJs
Belgian record producers